Umbria Volley was an Italian volleyball club based in the Umbria Region. The club was founded as Pet Company Perugia Volley in 2001. Since the season 2001/02 the club plays in the A1 league, the top league in Italy.

After the season 2011/12, Umbria Volley was closed down and succeeded by Altotevere Volley.

Famous players
  Osvaldo Hernández
 Rafael Pascual 
 Ibán Pérez
 Robert Kromm
  Goran Vujević
 Konstantin Čupković
 Nikola Kovačević
 Behnam Mahmoudi
 Ivan Zaytsev

References

External links
Official site (Italian)

Italian volleyball clubs
Volleyball clubs established in 2001
2001 establishments in Italy